Irony punctuation is any form of notation proposed or used to denote irony or sarcasm in text. Written English lacks a standard way to mark irony, and several forms of punctuation have been proposed. Among the oldest and most frequently attested are the percontation point, proposed by English printer Henry Denham in the 1580s, and the irony mark, used by Marcellin Jobard and French poet Alcanter de Brahm during the 19th century. Both marks take the form of a reversed question mark, "⸮".

Irony punctuation is primarily used to indicate that a sentence should be understood at a second level. A bracketed exclamation point or question mark as well as scare quotes are also occasionally used to express irony or sarcasm.

Percontation point
The percontation point

, a reversed question mark later referred to as a rhetorical question mark, was proposed by Henry Denham in the 1580s and was used at the end of a question that does not require an answer—a rhetorical question. Its use died out in the 17th century. This character can be represented using the reversed question mark (⸮) found in Unicode as U+2E2E; another character approximating it is the Arabic question mark (؟), U+061F.

The modern question mark (? U+003F) is descended from the "punctus interrogativus" (described as "a lightning flash, striking from right to left"), but unlike the modern question mark, the punctus interrogativus may be contrasted with the punctus percontativus—the former marking questions that require an answer while the latter marks rhetorical questions.

Irony mark
In 1668, John Wilkins, in An Essay towards a Real Character and a Philosophical Language, proposed using an inverted exclamation mark to punctuate ironic statements. In 1841, Marcellin Jobard, a Belgian newspaper publisher, introduced an irony mark in the shape of an oversized arrow head with small stem (rather like an ideogram of a Christmas tree). The next year he expanded his idea, suggesting the symbol could be used in various orientations (on its side, upside down, etc.) to mark "a point of irritation, an indignation point, a point of hesitation".

The irony point was proposed by the French poet Alcanter de Brahm (alias, Marcel Bernhardt) in his 1899 book L'ostensoir des ironies to indicate that a sentence should be understood at a second level (irony, sarcasm, etc.). It is illustrated by a glyph resembling, but not identical to, a small, elevated, backward-facing question mark. The same mark was used earlier by Marcellin Jobard in an article dated June 11, 1841, and commented in an 1842 report.

Hervé Bazin, in his essay "Plumons l'Oiseau" ("Let's pluck the bird", 1966), used the Greek letter ψ with a dot below for the same purpose . In the same work, the author proposed five other innovative punctuation marks: the "doubt point" , "conviction point" , "acclamation point" , "authority point" , and "love point" .

In March 2007, the Dutch foundation CPNB (Collectieve Propaganda van het Nederlandse Boek) presented another design of an irony mark, the ironieteken:.

Reverse italics (Sartalics)
Tom Driberg recommended that ironic statements should be printed in italics that lean the other way from conventional italics, also called Sartalics.

Scare quotes

Scare quotes are a particular use of quotation marks. They are placed around a word or phrase to indicate that it is not used in the fashion that the writer would personally use it. In contrast to the nominal typographic purpose of quotation marks, the enclosed words are not necessarily quoted from another source. When read aloud, various techniques are used to convey the sense, such as prepending the addition of "so-called" or a similar word or phrase of disdain, using a sarcastic or mocking tone, or using air quotes, or any combination of the above.

Temherte slaqî
In certain Ethiopic languages, sarcasm and unreal phrases are indicated at the end of a sentence with a sarcasm mark called temherte slaqî or temherte slaq, a character that looks like the inverted exclamation point (U+00A1) ( ¡ ).

Other typography

Rhetorical questions in some informal situations can use a bracketed question mark, e.g., "Oh, really[?]". The equivalent for an ironic or sarcastic statement would be a bracketed exclamation mark, e.g., "Oh, really[!]". Subtitles, such as in Teletext, sometimes use an exclamation mark within brackets or parentheses to mark sarcasm.

It is common in online conversation among some Internet users to use a closing XML tag: </sarcasm>. Over time, it has evolved to lose the angle brackets (/sarcasm) and has subsequently been shortened to /sarc or /s (not to be confused with the HTML end tag </s> used to end a struck-through passage). This usage later evolved into tone indicators.

Another example is bracketing text with the symbol for the element iron as a pun of the word "irony" (<Fe> and </Fe>) in order to denote irony. Typing in all-capital letters, and emoticons like "Rolling eyes", ":>", and ":P," as well as using the "victory hand" dingbat / emoji character to simulate air quotes, are often used as well, particularly in instant messaging, while a Twitter-style hashtag, #sarcasm, is also increasingly common.

In many gaming communities, the word "Kappa" is frequently used to display sarcasm as well as joking intent. This is due to the word acting as an emoticon on Twitch, a livestreaming site, where it has gained popularity for such purpose.

It is also common to use the combination of an open-parenthesis and an interrogation symbol as "(?" to mark irony.

A "SarcMark" symbol requiring custom computer font software was proposed in 2010.

Another method of expressing sarcasm is by placing a tilde (~) adjacent to the punctuation. This allows for easy use with any keyboard, as well as variation. Variations include dry sarcasm (~.), enthusiastic sarcasm (~!), and sarcastic questions (~?). The sports blog Card Chronicle has adopted this methodology by inserting (~) after the period at the end of the sentence. It has also been adopted by the Udacity Machine Learning Nanodegree community.

On the Internet, it is common to see alternating uppercase and lowercase lettering to convey a mocking or sarcastic tone, often paired with an image of SpongeBob SquarePants acting like a chicken in the form of memes.
CollegeHumor jokingly proposed new marks called “sarcastisies” which resemble ragged, or zig-zagged parentheses, used to enclose sarcastic remarks.

The upside-down face emoji (🙃) Is often used to convey sarcasm. However, it can also be understood to indicate a variety of subtle or concealed emotions. These can include annoyance, indignation, panic, mockery, and other more ambiguous feelings.

See also

 Emoticon
 Interrobang
 Inverted question and exclamation marks (¿¡)
 Poe's law
 Mirrored question mark
 Internet slang
 Fnord

References

Sources

External links
 Ironic Serif: A Brief History of Typographic Snark and the Failed Crusade for an Irony Mark
 How to Tell a Joke on the Internet; The new typography of irony

Irony
Punctuation